The Nokia E72 is a smartphone from the Nokia Eseries range manufactured in Finland. The Nokia E72 was announced on June 15, 2009 at the Nokia Connections 2009 event in Singapore. It is the successor to the Nokia E71 and is based on a similar design and form factor, and offers a similar feature set. The Nokia E72 is a business-oriented phone (as all Eseries devices) and has standard features including mobile email, calendar and instant messaging among many others with its Symbian-based S60 3rd Edition Feature Pack 2 operating system.

The Nokia E72 has a new Optical Navi Key feature in addition to the standard D-pad used on many other Nokia devices including the Nokia E71 – this is said to improve the ease of scrolling through menus, emails, Internet browser, and images as it is an optical sensor in addition to a series of closely spaced buttons. In comparison to its predecessor, the Nokia E72 is said to have a higher level of performance (likely due to the faster 600 MHz ARM processor) and also includes a 5-megapixel auto focusing camera. Other changes and improvements are software-based including changes to the user interface and built-in messaging application among others.

The Nokia E73 Mode is a USA feature phone for T-Mobile USA, with support for T-Mobile's UMA service and Band IV support for 3G. It is a different piece of hardware internally from the E72.

The current firmware of this device is 91.004 published on 2 June 2012 (to check the current firmware, one may dial *#0000#).

The Vertu Constellation Quest from 2010 is based on the E72 design.

Features and enhancements from E71

New features 
 Symbian OS 9.3, Series 60 v3.2 UI, Feature Pack 2.
 Optical navi key, along with the conventional D-Pad
 3.5 mm audio jack
 Ovi Maps with free lifetime drive and walk voice assisted navigation
 Lifetime free Nokia Messaging service (discontinued)
 Use of front-facing camera (video call, VGA snapshots and QCIF videos for 15 seconds)
 USB charging
 Magnetometer sensor and digital compass
 RDS support
 PictBridge
 uPnP media streaming support (not present on E73)
 UMA (E73)

Upgrades 
 Modified design and look compared to E71.
 3.5 mm jack in contrast to the 2.5 mm jack used in the E71.
 12 hours of talktime (2G) instead of the E71's 10 hours (2G).
 Tri-band UMTS/HSDPA/HSUPA instead of dual-band
 HSDPA support of up to 10.2 Mbit/s instead of 3.6
 Added HSUPA at 2.0 Mbit/s
 Improved CPU clock speed from 369 MHz to 600 MHz
 Real time Push e-mail HTML
 Improved reception from the E71's fluctuating signal reception
 5-megapixel camera (up from 3.2)
 VGA at 15 frame/s (E72) rather than QVGA at 15 frame/s (E71)
 New flashlight feature (it can be activated by holding down the space bar)

See also 
 Nokia Eseries
 Nokia E5-00 Reduced-cost version of the E72
 Nokia N72
 Nokia E73 Mode

References

Further reading

External links 

 Nokia E72 Full Phone Specification
Device details — Nokia E72

Mobile phones introduced in 2009
Mobile phones with an integrated hardware keyboard
Nokia ESeries
Mobile_phones_with_user-replaceable_battery

de:Nokia Eseries#Nokia E72